The General Beauregard Equestrian Statue, honoring P. G. T. Beauregard, was located in New Orleans, Louisiana, United States. The statue, by Alexander Doyle, one of the premier American sculptors, was officially unveiled in 1915.

It was at the intersection of Carrollton Avenue and Esplanade Avenue at the main entrance to City Park, on Beauregard Circle. The statue was added to the National Register of Historic Places on February 18, 1999.

Removal
On June 24, 2015, New Orleans Mayor Mitch Landrieu acknowledged the impact of the June 2015 Charleston church shooting, and after talking with New Orleans jazz ambassador Wynton Marsalis, Landrieu called for the removal of several city memorials to Confederates.

As part of a sixty-day period for public comment, two city commissions accepted the Mayor's call for the removal of four monuments associated with the Confederacy, including statues of Robert E. Lee, Jefferson Davis and Beauregard, and an obelisk commemorating the Battle of Liberty Place. Governor Bobby Jindal opposed the removals.

On December 17, 2015, the New Orleans City Council voted 6-to-1 to remove the Gen. Beauregard Statue, along with three other historical monuments built 100 to 135 years ago. Mayor Landrieu announced that the removal of the monuments would happen within days.

The statue's removal began on May 16, 2017, and was completed on May 17.

After the statue was removed, its pedestal remained in place. On July 25, 2018 after the base of the statue was removed, a time capsule was discovered to exist. The capsule was opened on August 3, 2018 and found to contain Confederate memorabilia, including photos of Confederate General Robert E. Lee and Confederate President Jefferson Davis, along with flags, currency, medals, ribbons and other paper items related to the city. Officials stated that the copper box was placed in the statue's pedestal on November 14, 1913, a year before the statue was erected.

See also
National Register of Historic Places listings in Orleans Parish, Louisiana
Robert E. Lee Monument
Jefferson Davis Monument
Bronze Soldier of Tallinn in Estonia
Removal of Confederate monuments and memorials

References

External links
 

1915 establishments in Louisiana
1915 sculptures
P. G. T. Beauregard
Bronze sculptures in Louisiana
Buildings and structures in New Orleans
Confederate States of America monuments and memorials in Louisiana
Equestrian statues in Louisiana
Monuments and memorials on the National Register of Historic Places in Louisiana
National Register of Historic Places in New Orleans
Outdoor sculptures in Louisiana
Sculptures of men in Louisiana
Relocated buildings and structures in Louisiana
Removed Confederate States of America monuments and memorials
Time capsules